This is a list of notable people from Prešov, Slovakia

C
 Kyla Cole, Slovak glamour model

E
 József Eötvös, president of Hungarian Academy of Sciences, Minister of Educational-Cultural, lawyer, politician

G
 István Gyöngyösi, poet

H
 Béla Hamvas, writer, philosopher

K
 Ferenc Kazinczy, Hungarian author, the most indefatigable agent in the regeneration of the Hungarian language and literature
 Katarína Knechtová, Slovak singer
 Lajos Kossuth, politician, lawyer and Hungary Regent-President of in 1849
 Juraj Kukura, Slovak actor

L
 Peter Lipa, Slovak singer

M
 Pál Maléter, Hungarian Minister of Defence, a martyr of Hungarian Revolution of 1956
 Vladimir Mihalik, professional hockey player for the Tampa Bay Lightning (NHL)

P
 Ferenc Pulszky, politician, archaeologist, art historian

R
 Ferenc Rákóczi, prince of Transylvania
 Albert Rusnák, footballer

S
 Juraj Simek, professional hockey player for the Tampa Bay Lightning (NHL)

T
 Ivan Tásler, Slovak singer
 Imre Thököly, prince of Transylvania

 
People from Presov
Presov